Siniša Mihajlović (20 February 1969 – 16 December 2022) was a Serbian professional football player and manager.

During his career as a footballer, he played as a defender or midfielder. He won the European Cup with Red Star Belgrade in 1991, and played for the majority of his career in the Italian Serie A, making 353 appearances for Roma, Sampdoria, Lazio and Inter Milan and winning league titles with the latter two clubs. Considered by many to be among the best free kick takers of all time, he holds the all-time record in Serie A for most goals from free-kicks with 28 goals. He won 63 caps and scored 10 goals for Yugoslavia from 1991 to 2003, of which his first four caps in 1991 represented SFR Yugoslavia, and played in the 1998 FIFA World Cup and UEFA Euro 2000 tournaments.  

Mihajlović retired from playing in 2006, becoming assistant manager at Inter. He managed six Serie A clubs from 2008 to 2022, starting and finishing with Bologna and also including Fiorentina, Torino and A.C. Milan even after his diagnosis in 2019. He was the coach of the Serbia national team from May 2012 to November 2013 as well.

Early life
Born in Vukovar into a working-class family of a Bosnian Serb father and a Croat mother, Mihajlović was raised in Borovo Naselje with a younger brother, Dražen (b. 1973). Their father Bogdan (d. 2011) hailing from the Kukulje village between Srbac and Laktaši was a truck driver at the Građevinar construction company in Vukovar, while their mother Viktorija worked in the Borovo shoe factory. Mihajlović identifies as a Serb, but has said that he views Croatia as his country as well.

Throughout his late teens, Mihajlović was part of the Yugoslav golden generation that ended up winning the 1987 FIFA World Youth Championship in Chile, however, he was not selected in the team that head coach Mirko Jozić took to the tournament.

During the Croatian War of Independence, his home was destroyed by Croatian forces, among whom was his childhood best friend, an ethnic Croat, forcing his parents to flee. His maternal uncle called his mother and said that she should stay in Borovo, while her husband, Siniša's father, was to be killed. When the Serbian Volunteer Guard took over Borovo they captured the uncle, and found Siniša's number in his address book; Siniša was called and asked if they were relatives – he had him saved. In a 2016 interview Mihajlović said he had forgiven his childhood friend in a meeting in Zagreb prior to the crucial Euro 2000 qualification match between FR Yugoslavia and Croatia.

Club career

Early career
Mihajlović started playing organized football with NK Borovo, a lower-rank club from his hometown. He quickly marked himself out as a talented youngster, making the SR Croatia select squad for the Yugoslav inter-republic youth football tournaments.

In 1986, he was attached to NK Borovo's first team. Playing in the SR Croatia republic/provincial league (third tier competition on the Yugoslav club football pyramid), his first team debut took place on 25 May 1986 against Šparta in Beli Manastir. The match ended 1–1 with Mihajlović scoring a goal. The 17-year-old also got his first taste of professionalism with his first monthly salary being CHF500.

In late 1986, Red Star Belgrade representatives led by scout Kule Aćimović came to watch the seventeen-year-old in a friendly Borovo played against FK Rad, but decided not to sign him.

Then in late spring 1987, amid NK Rijeka and Dinamo Vinkovci already courting young Mihajlović, Dinamo Zagreb—led by club president Ivo Vrhovec and head coach Ćiro Blažević—entered the fray after being made aware of the talented youngster with a thunderous long-distance striking ability by their own youth players Zvonimir Boban and Robert Prosinečki who had been playing with Mihajlović on the SR Croatia select youth team at inter-republic/provincial youth tournaments. The club's assistant and youth coach Josip Kuže recommended the kid to his boss Blažević. After seeing Mihajlović in a training session, Blažević agreed about the eighteen-year-old's potential, taking him with the rest of the first team to Sassari for an impromptu getaway between two league matches towards the end of the season, even giving the teenager a substitute appearance in Dinamo shirt in a friendly versus local club Torres Sassari.

The courtship between the club and the player continued over the summer off-season, and, in September 1987, eighteen-year-old Mihajlović was invited to join Dinamo's youth squad for a friendly tournament in Salem, West Germany where he left a good impression, leading to a glowing recommendation from Zdenko Kobeščak, another Dinamo youth coach who led the youth squad at the tournament in West Germany. However, no deal was agreed again as the club's head coach Ćiro Blažević did not seem intent on pursuing Mihajlović beyond cursory interest, feeling that Dinamo already had players for the central midfield position that were "just as good if not better", such as incoming Haris Škoro as well as club mainstay Marko Mlinarić and returnee Stjepan Deverić. Apparently, among the things colourful Blažević imparted to youngster Mihajlović on the occasion was a stern suggestion to cut his long hair and be prepared to be the fourth option for a position in Dinamo's midfield. Since Dinamo was unwilling to fully commit to the player—offering just a stipend-based agreement instead of a professional contract—Mihajlović decided to continue with NK Borovo. Not overly keen on the young third-tier league player, to begin with, and thus not too bothered about losing him, Blažević reportedly even joked that "two Mihajlovićs would be too much for Dinamo" in light of the fact Dinamo had already secured an advance agreement with the, at the time more established, Yugoslav First League player Radmilo Mihajlović (no relation to Siniša) about joining the following season.

The decision not to take Dinamo's offer was a costly one for young Mihajlović career-wise as the Yugoslavia under-20 head coach Mirko Jozić had already made it clear to the teenager he would not be called up for the upcoming FIFA World Youth Championship in Chile unless he signed with the Zagreb club.

Vojvodina
On the initiative by FK Vojvodina's sporting director Milorad Kosanović, Mihajlović arrived to Novi Sad in summer 1988 as part of a slate of players acquired by the club during the same transfer window: talented 19-year-old defensive midfielder Slaviša Jokanović as well as a pair of 24-year-old defenders Budimir Vujačić and Miroslav Tanjga.

Playing alongside seasoned Yugoslav league veterans like forward Miloš Šestić and goalkeeper Čedo Maras, each one of the four new acquisitions made major contribution on the squad led by also newly-arrived head coach Ljupko Petrović as FK Vojvodina somewhat improbably went on to win the Yugoslav league title ahead of the Big Four clubs. Young Mihajlović immediately grabbed a midfield spot, appearing in 31 league matches, scoring 4 goals.

The following 1989–90 season saw Vojvodina compete in the European Cup for only the second time in club history. Though most of the key players from the previous league-winning season remained, Vojvodina stumbled at the very first hurdle versus Hungarian champions Honvéd. Losing the first leg 1–0 away at Budapest, seemingly a decent away result, was still extremely disappointing considering Honvéd played with 10 men from the 15th minute. At the return home leg played in front of half-empty stadium things went much better as Vojvodina got up 2–0 (including a bizarre opening goal from Šestić's in-swinging corner that Mihajlović deflected into goal using his hand), however a late own goal by defender Dragan Gaćeša dashed Vojvodina hopes of progressing further.

Red Star Belgrade
Twenty-one-year-old Mihajlović joined Red Star Belgrade on 10 December 1990 in a high-profile transfer with a transfer fee of DM1 million paid out to Vojvodina. As for his personal salary terms, the midfielder signed a 4-year contract for DM240,000 in total, plus the club bought him a Mazda 323F and a 3-bedroom apartment in Belgrade.

Arriving to a club coached by his old Vojvodina mentor Ljupko Petrović, Mihajlović was brought in to establish a robust presence on the left side of midfield as well as to score set-piece goals. With a price tag suggesting immediate high expectations and finding himself on the squad full of rising European stars such as Dejan Savićević, Robert Prosinečki, Vladimir Jugović, Darko Pančev in addition to already established Miodrag Belodedici, Mihajlović fit in very well right from the start. Joining the league leaders in the middle of the league season winter break, Mihajlović's first appearance in the Red Star shirt took place on 10 January 1991 in a friendly against lower-ranked FK Beograd as an unusually large number of fans came out to the ramshackle Karaburma ground to see the million DM player. Once the league season restarted, he would end up making 14 league appearances, but his most memorable moment came in the European Cup semi-final return leg versus Bayern Munich: in a man of the match performance, Mihajlović scored both Red Star goals—the free-kick opener as well as the dramatic injury time winner on a shot that deflected off Klaus Augenthaler. In the final, Red Star defeated Olympique de Marseille on penalties, after a 0–0 draw at full time, with Mihajlović being one of the shootout scorers. Over twenty years later in 2011, talking to a French football magazine about the famous win in Bari, Mihajlović said:

Mihajlović was also in the team later that year when Red Star Belgrade won the Intercontinental Cup, defeating Colo-Colo 3–0. He was then included by Yugoslavia national football team to UEFA Euro 1992, but the nation would be suspended due to the Yugoslav Wars.

Roma
In summer 1992, amid interest from Juventus, Mihajlović ended up going to Roma for a reported ITL8.5 billion (~US$5.9 million) transfer fee on initiative by compatriot head coach Vujadin Boškov, also a new arrival to Olimpico, having led Sampdoria in the European Cup Final mere months earlier. Arriving to Rome from Belgrade—via first being driven over the border to Sofia followed by a stopover flight to Vienna due to the UN embargo on FR Yugoslavia cutting international flights from Belgrade—Mihajlović and his agent Vladimir Pavković were met by club president Giuseppe Ciarrapico as the player underwent a thorough six-hour physical and signed a contract with the club. Joining the squad led on the pitch by the talisman midfielder and hometown hero Giuseppe Giannini, the Giallorossi were looking to improve on their previous season's 5th place league finish.

Despite competing for the three foreign matchday spots against notable and established foreigners Aldair, Thomas Häßler, and new arrival Claudio Caniggia, Mihajlović managed to achieve a first team spot in the left midfield as well as to turn in a decent season with a single goal in 29 league appearances. However, the team had a disappointing overall season, finishing 10th in Serie A standings. Mihajlović also played a significant part in Roma's UEFA Cup campaign where they reached the quarterfinals—losing to Borussia Dortmund in a tie that saw the Serb score a trademark free-kick for a 1–0 first leg lead, before being beaten 2–0 in the return. Due to a long-term injury to Roma's left back Amedeo Carboni midway through the season, coach Boškov moved Mihajlović to the left back position.

The 1993–94 season started with new head coach Carlo Mazzone in charge as Boškov got shown the door. In addition to existing four foreigners, the club brought in Argentine ace Abel Balbo thus increasing competition for three foreign spots. Mihajlović, for his part, still played the left back position under the new gaffer, which the player wasn't personally happy with. Still, even without European competition, the team again underachieved in Serie A, finishing in 7th spot—out of Europe for the second season running.

Years later, talking about his playing days, retired Mihajlović referred to his stay in Roma as "the two worst seasons of my entire career".

Sampdoria
During summer 1994 transfer window, Mihajlović joined the third-placed club in previous season's Serie A standings and Coppa Italia winners – Sampdoria coached by Sven-Göran Eriksson. A few years removed from its late 1980s and early 1990s heyday, the Genoa side was still a very ambitious outfit, if not as financially stable, looking to challenge for trophies. Also arriving the same summer were Inter stalwarts Walter Zenga and Riccardo Ferri as part of the deal that took goalkeeper Gianluca Pagliuca the other way. For Mihajlović, the arrival to Marassi meant getting reunited with former Red Star teammate Vladimir Jugović.

Mihajlović's competitive debut for the club took place in late August 1994 in the Supercoppa Italiana match versus league champions AC Milan. It ended with mixed feelings: the Serb scored a trademark free-kick for the go-ahead goal, but after the contest ended in a draw and went to penalties, Mihajlović's spot kick hit the outer side of the crossbar and stayed out.

In his four seasons at Sampdoria, Mihajlović saw limited success in the Serie A. In the European competitions, however, he helped Sampdoria reach the 1994–95 UEFA Cup Winners' Cup semifinal, where they got eliminated by Arsenal on penalties.

In June 1998, Mihajlović represented FR Yugoslavia at the 1998 FIFA World Cup, playing all Yugoslav matches in the tournament. He scored a goal against Iran, and conceded an own goal against Germany. This made Mihajlović one of only five players to score both a goal and an own goal in the World Cup; the other ones being Ernie Brandts, Ruud Krol, Gustavo Peña and Mario Mandžukić.

Lazio
In the summer of 1998, Mihajlović was brought to Lazio by head coach Sven-Göran Eriksson and club president Sergio Cragnotti for £8.5 million. Very quickly after coming back to the capital, Mihajlović finally won his first piece of silverware in Italy as Lazio beat Juventus in the Supercoppa Italiana during late August 1998.

An ambitious outfit backed by Cragnotti's food business, Lazio already challenged for major trophies as it finished the previous season a Coppa Italia winner and a UEFA Cup runner-up. However, league success still proved elusive with 7th place in Serie A simply not meeting expectations.

Strengthening the squad for a serious run at the Serie A title, in addition to Mihajlović, the summer 1998 transfer window also saw Cragnotti bring in 19-year-old midfield talent Dejan Stanković from Red Star Belgrade, established goalscorer Marcelo Salas from River Plate, and finally near the end of the transfer window as the biggest coup of all, superstar striker Christian Vieri from Atlético Madrid.

With Lazio, Mihajlović reached the final of the 1999 UEFA Cup Winners' Cup, winning the last edition of that competition with a 2–1 victory against RCD Mallorca. Lazio also won the 1999 UEFA Super Cup. He played 26 times and scored seven goals during the Serie A 1999–2000 season as Lazio won the second Scudetto in club history. Mihajlović completed the double by helping Lazio win the 2000 Coppa Italia. Mihajlović represented Yugoslavia internationally again, as he selected to compete at the Euro 2000 tournament. In the first Yugoslav game of the tournament, Mihajlović was sent off against Slovenia. He served a one-game suspension before playing the last two games of the tournament.

Mihajlović won his last trophy with Lazio in 2004, beating Juventus in the Coppa Italia final.

Inter Milan
In the summer 2004, 35-year-old Mihajlović was released from Lazio and joined his friend and former teammate Roberto Mancini at Inter Milan on a free transfer, signing a one-year deal. On 16 June 2005 Mihajlović signed a one-year extension.

On 9 April 2006, in a league away game versus Ascoli, Mihajlović scored his 27th career free-kick goal in the Serie A championship. Mihajlović ended his playing career after the 2005–06 season, aged 37, having one Serie A championship, two Coppa Italia trophies and a Supercoppa Italia title as an Inter player.

International career
Playing as a youth international, Mihajlović featured in 5 games at the 1990 UEFA European Under-21 Championship.

Between 1991 and 2003, Mihajlović was capped 63 times and scored 10 goals for the national team of Yugoslavia/Serbia and Montenegro. He participated at the 1998 FIFA World Cup where he scored a free-kick against Iran as Yugoslavia reached the second round. He also participated at UEFA Euro 2000. He was sent off in Yugoslavia's opening game against Slovenia but returned after a one match ban with Yugoslavia reaching the quarter-final.

Style of play
Early into his playing career, Mihajlović marked himself out with an extraordinary long-distance striking, crossing, and passing ability. His precise curling yet hard-driven left-footed shot allowed him to score  free-kick goals on a regular basis. A set-piece and penalty kick specialist, Mihajlović has said that he has scored free-kicks from as far as 35 yards, adding in a 2000 interview with BBC Sport: "I like to shoot with a swerve into both sides of the net. I often try scoring directly from the corners.". Regarded as one of the greatest free kick takers of all time, he was capable of both scoring and creating chances from dead ball opportunities, and holds the record for the most goals in Serie A from free-kicks, alongside Andrea Pirlo, with 28 goals, as well as the record for second most goals from free kicks for a single Serie A club in all competitions, with 43, behind Alessandro Del Piero. Along with Giuseppe Signori, he is one of only two players who have scored a hat-trick from free kicks in Serie A, a feat which he accomplished during his time with Lazio, in a 5–2 win over Sampdoria, on 13 December 1998, during the 1998–99 season.

During his club career in Yugoslavia with Vojvodina and Red Star Belgrade as well as during his early spell at Roma, he played on the left side of midfield as winger, or as an attacking midfielder on occasion, where he was known for his stamina, speed, foot-work, and ability to cover the flank with his runs, as well as his excellent ball-striking ability with his left foot, and his ability to dictate attacking plays in midfield. Upon moving to Italy, midway through his first season in Serie A, Mihajlović was moved to the position of left back by Roma head coach Vujadin Boškov. The following season, under Roma's new head coach Carlo Mazzone, mostly continued at left back while occasionally deployed as a defensive midfielder, although his performances in this position were somewhat inconsistent due to his limited tactical sense. In 1994, after transferring to Sampdoria under head coach Sven-Göran Eriksson, Mihajlović was moved to the centre of the team's defensive line, and remained in this position for the rest of his career. He later excelled in this newfound centre back role, where he functioned as a sweeper, due to his consistent defensive displays, physique, intelligence, leadership, and tenacity, as well as his good technique, touch on the ball, and long passing ability, which enabled him to play the ball out from the back; he drew praise from manager Carlo Mazzone, in particular, who described him as one of the best players in the world in his position.

Managerial career

Assistant at Inter Milan
After retiring from playing at Inter Milan, Mihajlović right away began a coaching career at San Siro as assistant to head coach Roberto Mancini. Mihajlović and Mancini share a longtime friendship after playing together for five seasons at Sampdoria and Lazio.

Mihajlović's free-kick expertise has been praised by Zlatan Ibrahimović, who after several successful free-kicks thanked the then assistant coach Mihajlović who had trained him for two years at Inter.

Mancini was fired in June 2008 by club president Massimo Moratti at the end of the 2007–08 season to make way for José Mourinho. Mihajlović left the club on the same occasion.

Bologna
On 3 November 2008, Mihajlović was appointed to replace Daniele Arrigoni at the helm of Serie A relegation-battling club Bologna. His Serie A bench debut came on 8 November 2008 at home versus Roma. The match ended in a 1–1 draw. His arrival to Bologna bench was characterized by five consecutive league draws before finally winning a match, a 5–2 victory against fellow bottom-feeder rivals Torino on 13 December 2008.

Mihajlović was sacked by Bologna on 14 April 2009 in the wake of a 1–4 home defeat against Siena, which dragged the team back into the relegation zone with seven matches remaining in the season. His tenure suffered from media rumours that he had numerous high-profile disagreements with senior players at the club which led to the poor form that eventually cost him the job. Under new head coach Giuseppe Papadopulo, Bologna avoided relegation to the Serie B on the last day of the season with a win over Catania.

Catania
On 8 December 2009 Mihajlović was appointed new head coach of Catania, taking over from Gianluca Atzori.
 He signed a contract until June 2011 with gli elefanti, hiring Dario Marcolin—his former teammate at Lazio and colleague on Mancini's coaching staff at Inter—to be his assistant. Arriving at the club placed dead last in Serie A standings, Mihajlović made his debut with a home loss versus relegation rivals Livorno. However, the following week, his team pulled off a stunning upset by beating heavily favoured Juventus away in Turin with a 1–2 scoreline.

A successive string of good results, together with a number of key January signings such as former Argentine international striker Maxi López, helped Mihajlović keep the team out of the relegation zone and provide a number of very impressive performances. Another season highlight then came on 13 March 2010, as Catania achieved a historic 3–1 win versus Serie A league-toppers and Mihajlović's former team Inter Milan.

Led by Mihajlović, Catania finished the season in 13th spot, well out of the relegation zone.

He resigned at the end of the season on 24 May 2010 amid reports linking him to incumbent UEFA Champions League winners Inter as a replacement for outgoing boss José Mourinho, which did not come to anything in the end.

Fiorentina
On 3 June 2010, Mihajlović was announced as the new head coach of Fiorentina, replacing outgoing Cesare Prandelli who had left the Tuscan club a few days earlier once appointed by the Italian Football Federation (FIGC) to become the new manager of the Italy national team.

Fiorentina had an underwhelming domestic league season behind them under Prandelli, finishing the campaign in eleventh place despite simultaneously making the Champions League round-of-16 stage where they got eliminated by Bayern Munich on away goals, in large part due to questionable first leg officiating when a clearly offside Miroslav Klose goal was allowed to stand by the Norwegian referee Tom Henning Øvrebø and his linesman. The Serb signed a two-year contract on a salary of just under €1 million per year and with no distraction of European football, the talented team seemed poised for a good Serie A season with Mihajlović stating that making Europe is a realistic goal.

2010–11 season
However, right away, the team got dealt a major blow by a preseason right knee injury to Stevan Jovetić that would keep the attacking midfielder out for the entire season. 

The league campaign started poorly with two draws and two losses before a win was finally recorded in week 5 at home versus Parma. However, that win was followed by two straight losses as the team continuously hovered in and around relegation zone. 

Fiorentina's form finally started picking up in late October 2010 with a home win versus Bari, but, soon afterwards in November 2010, la Viola got further weakened by an injury to first-choice goalkeeper Sébastien Frey that kept him out for the rest of the season. Still, Mihajlović's team continued its slow climb up the standings. Though bad away form continued, they finished the first half of the season in twelfth spot. In January 2011, an old favourite reappeared since the doping-related ban on Adrian Mutu expired as the forward with whom Mihajlović shares some colourful history from playing days rejoined the squad. Also, Mihajlović signed winger Valon Behrami from West Ham United, but the alternating home and away form improved only slightly as the head coach experimented with various tactical formations. 

In February 2011, Fiorentina won on the road for the first time in the season with a win at Palermo. And in March 2011, the team finally recorded two straight wins for the first time in the season, climbing up to eight spot (their best placing the entire season other than the seventh spot after opening week's draw). Still, the momentum wasn't kept up for a possible late push towards a European spot, and, under Mihajlović, Fiorentina ended the league season with 12 wins (only three of those away from home), 11 losses, and 15 draws, which was good enough for ninth place – twelve points out of a European spot.

2011–12 season
During the summer 2011 transfer season, Mihajlović was strongly linked with a return to Inter in head coaching capacity, with certain Italian papers even reporting the specific date of his unveiling at the nerazzurri following supposed successful negotiations with Inter's sporting director Marco Branca. However, Mihajlović immediately denied those claims, pledging to stay on in Florence.

The season began in August 2011 with a Coppa Italia win over A.S. Cittadella. Couple of weeks later, still in late summer, the league season commenced at home with a 2–0 win over Mihajlović's former side Bologna, while the following week saw a loss away at Udine. Coming back home three days later for a match versus Parma, the side posted a 3–0 win followed by a hard-fought scoreless draw away at Napoli in front of 45,000 spectators. So at the end of September, four matches into the league season, things still looked decent, however, the first real blow was to come in the very next match at home versus Lazio – la Viola went ahead early, but the biancocelesti overturned the score 1–2 with Miroslav Klose scoring the winner in the 83rd minute. The loss was the sign of the things to come: the next match away at Cesena was a chance for redemption, but Fiorentina couldn't break down the resilient home team, despite having a man advantage from the 73rd minute as Adrian Mutu got sent off, the match ended 0–0. Six days later, more disappointment followed as la Viola led twice at home, but still dropped points to Catania 2–2, courtesy of Maxi Lopez's 82nd-minute equalizer. Failure to win the match brought boos and jeers from home fans. Winless in four matches, the trip to Turin to play resurgent Juventus couldn't have come at a worse time and the team succumbed 2–1, despite managing to equalize the score for a few minutes in the second half. With the winless streak now extended to five matches, Mihajlović was reportedly on thin ice and the word around Stadio Artemio Franchi was that he'd be sacked if he doesn't win the next match, at home versus Genoa. The knives were out for Mihajlović even from the team's own fans as he faced a barrage of abuse from the terraces throughout the match with calls for his sacking and even racist banners and chants targeting the coach's ethnicity. Still, despite the negative and hostile atmosphere, the team managed an unconvincing 1–0 win. The fans' verbal abuse of Mihajlović made headlines for the next couple of days and sections of Fiorentina support issued an apology of sorts to the coach by hanging a banner outside of the stadium. But the revival didn't last long as Mihajlović got sacked a week later on 7 November 2011, one day after the 1–0 away loss to ChievoVerona. The team was in 13th league spot with 12 points from 10 matches.

Serbia
In May 2012, the Football Association of Serbia signed him to become the head coach of the Serbia national team until the end of the 2014 FIFA World Cup in Brazil. Serbia finished third in Group A of the qualifying phase in October 2013 after which he parted ways with the Football Association.

Sampdoria
On 20 November 2013, Sampdoria named Mihajlović as the new head coach in place for Delio Rossi. He signed a one-year rolling contract with automatic extension in case of a successful escape from relegation in the ongoing season, with his assistant coach Nenad Sakić (a former Sampdoria player himself) following him too.

On his first season in charge, he guided Sampdoria to significant improvements in results and easily escaped relegation. He successively agreed to stay for one more season, after talks with new president Massimo Ferrero, who took over from the Garrone family in July 2014. In the first weeks of the 2014–15 season, he managed to obtain eight points and no defeats in the first four games of the season, overseeing quality performances from players such as Stefano Okaka. On 1 June 2015 he wrote an open letter to confirm his departure as the head coach of Sampdoria.

Milan
On 16 June 2015, Milan officially sacked Filippo Inzaghi, appointing Mihajlović as their new manager, with a contract until 30 June 2017. During his tenure at the club, he was highly praised for trusting and giving playing opportunities to Gianluigi Donnarumma, who was only 16 years old at the time. Mihajlović was sacked on 12 April 2016.

Torino

On 25 May 2016 he was officially appointed as the new manager of Torino, taking over from Gian Piero Ventura. He made his debut on the Granata bench on 13 August 2016 at the Stadio Olimpico Grande Torino with a 4–1 home win over Pro Vercelli in the third round of the Coppa Italia. Mihajlović fielded Torino with an aggressive 4-3-3 formation and by the midway point of the season registered a record for points (29) whilst under the presidency of Urbano Cairo,  but a less brilliant second half of the season ended with Torino in ninth place. He was sacked on 4 January 2018 following a 2–0 defeat to Juventus in the Coppa Italia.

Sporting CP
On 18 June 2018, Mihajlović took over as manager of Sporting CP, signing a three-year contract with the Portuguese club. Nine days after his arrival, he was sacked due to change of executive staff.

Return to Bologna
Because of the team's bad results with Filippo Inzaghi, on 28 January 2019, Mihajlović became Bologna manager for the second time in his managerial career.

On his second tenure at Bologna, he achieved an impressive 30 points in 17 games, in comparison with 14 points achieved by his predecessor Inzaghi; thanks to those results, he managed to keep Bologna into the top flight with ease, and was confirmed at the helm of Bologna for the following season.

On 13 July 2019, Mihajlović publicly announced in a press conference he was diagnosed with an acute form of leukemia, with sporting director Walter Sabatini confirming Mihajlović would stay in charge of the club nonetheless.

Mihajlović was sacked on 6 September 2022 after Bologna obtained three points across its first five matches in Serie A, ending a three-and-a-half-year spell with the club.

Controversies

Playing
Mihajlović developed and fostered a reputation as a hard-nosed, tough-tackling player with a short fuse and no fear. As such he has had many physical and verbal run-ins with opposing players that occasionally spilled outside of the pitch.

Already known as a player not backing away from physical play, the 22-year-old was one of the main protagonists of the ill-tempered 1991 Yugoslav Cup Final between Red Star and Hajduk Split on 8 May 1991 at the JNA Stadium in front of only 7,000 spectators. Although of secondary importance to Red Star, which was getting ready for the European Cup Final three weeks later, the match still featured a degree of tension due to pitting a Serbian side against a Croatian one in an atmosphere of inter-ethnic incidents between Croats and Croatian Serbs in eastern Slavonia and Dalmatia regions of SR Croatia, including Mihajlović's hometown Borovo that was a place of massacre only six days before the final. Early into the match Hajduk's 23-year-old defender Igor Štimac and Mihajlović got into frequent verbal altercations, and according to Mihajlović during one of their exchanges Štimac told him: "I hope our guys kill all of your family in Borovo." Fueling Mihajlović's rage further was the fact that due to the phone service interruptions, he had not heard from his parents in more than a week, and he admitted to spending the rest of the match targeting Štimac in an attempt to injure him severely. Štimac also didn't back down and the two exchanged plenty of reckless tackles as their private duel became a sideshow to the entire final. In the 70th minute Mihajlović slid in for a hard bone-crunching tackle on another Hajduk player Grgica Kovač that led to play temporarily being stopped as both sets of players confronted each other. Mihajlović was led away by Hajduk player Ante Miše (the two knew each other as they were both from Borovo) who grabbed him by the hair while Red Star's Ilija Najdoski grabbed Hajduk's Slaven Bilić by the hair at which point Štimac jumped into the fracas with a raised fist attempting to punch Najdoski. Mihajlović received a second yellow for the challenge on Kovač, and the referee Adem Fazlagić also gave Štimac a second yellow, which meant both players got sent off.

A month later on 5 June 1991, Red Star and Hajduk played another match, this time in the league. It was Red Star's first league match after becoming European champions a week earlier in Bari. The match was of no competitive importance as Red Star were already league champions elect while Hajduk was lagging far behind in eight place, but that didn't stop Mihajlović and Štimac from continuing their personal duel in another incident-filled match with Mihajlović getting sent off again.

At the 1998 FIFA World Cup Germany vs FR Yugoslavia group stage match, Jens Jeremies squared up to Mihajlović following a rough challenge by the Yugoslav and the two exchanged verbal insults. Though at first glance everything ended there, television camera from another angle caught Mihajlović spitting in the German's face.

Later that year in November, during the Lazio vs Partizan Cup Winners' Cup second round return leg, thirty-year-old Mihajlović had a match-long battle with twenty-year-old striker Mateja Kežman. Playing old cross-town rivals in front of large home crowd seemed to provide extra motivation for Mihajlović.

By Euro 2000, Mihajlović's temper was well noted in the football world and he showed lack of control again during the opening group stage match vs Slovenia. Three minutes after gifting Slovenia a 0–3 lead when his cross-field pass got intercepted by Zlatko Zahovič, frustrated Mihajlović first got a yellow card for hacking down a Slovenian player as they jostled for position while going up for a high ball. Mere seconds later, as tempers flared and Sašo Udovič and Albert Nađ exchanged insults, a completely rattled Mihajlović needlessly approached Udovič, giving him a slight petulant push. Udovič theatrically fell to the ground, resulting in Mihajlović receiving another yellow card from Portuguese referee Vítor Pereira thus getting himself sent off. Ten-man FR Yugoslavia still managed to come back in the last 30 minutes to tie the score 3–3.

Several months later, in October 2000, Mihajlović raised a storm of controversy due to allegedly directing racist remarks at Arsenal's Patrick Vieira. The incident occurred during an ill-tempered Lazio vs Arsenal UEFA Champions League match on 17 October 2000 at Stadio Olimpico. Throughout the contest, Mihajlović had run-ins with several Arsenal players, including Martin Keown and Robert Pires, but things really boiled over after the final whistle as Mihajlović and Vieira were seen trading insults and trying to get at one another physically before being restrained by teammates. After the match, Vieira spoke to the media, accusing Mihajlović of racist abuse, specifically remarks that were revealed to be "nero di merda" (black piece of shit) or "fucking black monkey." Mihajlović subsequently apologized, but contended that his words were in retaliation to Vieira's remarks, calling Mihajlović a "zingaro di merda" (Gypsy piece of shit). Two months later, in December 2000, Mihajlović came under police investigation over the event for possibly violating an anti-racism law in Italy. Italian investigators planned on using Mihajlović's own post-game admission about insulting Vieira to file charges of violating a 1993 law that criminalizes the "spreading ... of ideas based on racial or ethnic superiority or hate", however nothing ever came of it. Six years later Mihajlović and Vieira became part of the same team when the Senegalese-born Frenchman joined Inter where freshly retired from playing Mihajlović was already named assistant to head coach Roberto Mancini. By all accounts, the former on-pitch adversaries got along very well during their two years together at San Siro. Vieira even came as one of the guests for Mihajlović's testimonial match on 28 May 2007 in Novi Sad.

On 7 November 2003, Mihajlović received an eight-match suspension by UEFA for spitting at and kicking Chelsea's Adrian Mutu during a Champions League group stage match. Some six and a half years later, Mihajlović became the head coach of Fiorentina, where Mutu had already been playing at the time.

Even in the twilight of his playing career, at Inter, 36-year-old Mihajlović stuck to his physical defensive style, getting into memorable tussles with Juve's 23-year-old rising superstar Zlatan Ibrahimović during the Derby d'Italia.

Managerial
A vocal and outspoken presence, known for his leadership, Mihajlović has, however, also attracted much controversy throughout both his playing and coaching careers, due to having expressed controversial political views and affiliations.

Amid Javier Clemente's failure to qualify the Serbia national team for Euro 2008—and September 2007 Serbian press reports about the Inter Milan assistant coach Mihajlović being set to take over the national team head coaching post that eventually didn't come to fruition as the job went to Miroslav Đukić—Mihajlović publicly came out against the Serbia FA (FSS) president Zvezdan Terzić, accusing him in October 2007 of "giving national team call-ups to players [he has private contracts with] in order to boost their transfer value". Terzić did not directly respond to the accusation, which Mihajlović repeated several months later during early March 2008 in the wake of Terzić's time on the run from Serbian law enforcement over accusations of player transfer fee skimming.

Soon after eventually landing the Serbia national team head coaching job in May 2012 under the next FA president Tomislav Karadžić, Mihajlović drew up a code-of-conduct to be signed by players called up for international duty. One of the central points was his insistence that players sing the national anthem before matches. On 28 May, after Adem Ljajić failed to do so despite signing the code-of-conduct, Mihajlović removed him from the team.

In December 2012, Mihajlović sued the football agent Zoran Đurić for libel over his claims expressed during SOS channel's Total Soccer programme that "sports agents Fali Ramadani and Sergio Berti have a large influence on Mihajlović's national team squad selection".

In late March 2013, in the wake of the 2014 FIFA World Cup qualifier loss to Croatia, Mihajlović and Terzić reignited their public feud from six years prior, with the former Serbian FA president—who had in the meantime returned to the country from being on the run and completed a prison term following a plea deal—repeating Đurić's recent accusation about Mihajlović having "his national team match day squads selected by Sergio Berti". Mihajlović announced plans to sue Terzić for libel over the remark.

Personal life and death
Mihajlović was married to Arianna Rapaccioni, an Italian former television presenter, with whom he had five children; three sons and two daughters. On 13 July 2019, Mihajlović publicly announced that he was diagnosed with an acute form of leukaemia, however still stayed on as manager of Bologna. He underwent a bone marrow transplant after three cycles of chemotherapy.

In October 2021 he became a grandfather, after his daughter Virginia gave birth to a daughter. The father is Alessandro Vogliacco, who plays for Genoa.

Mihajlović died on 16 December 2022 in a Rome clinic following complications of leukaemia. At that time he was 53 years old.

Career statistics

Club

International

Scores and results list Templatonia's goal tally first, score column indicates score after each Mihajlović goal.

Managerial statistics

Honours

Player
Vojvodina
Yugoslav First League: 1988–89

Red Star Belgrade
Yugoslav First League: 1990–91, 1991–92
European Cup: 1990–91
Intercontinental Cup: 1991

Lazio
Serie A: 1999–2000
Coppa Italia: 1999–2000, 2003–04
Supercoppa Italiana: 1998, 2000
UEFA Cup Winners Cup: 1998–99
UEFA Super Cup: 1999

Inter Milan
Serie A: 2005–06
Coppa Italia: 2004–05, 2005–06
Supercoppa Italiana: 2005

Yugoslavia U21
UEFA European Under-21 Championship runner-up: 1990

Individual
ESM Team of the Year: 1998–99, 1999–2000
FR Yugoslavia player of the Year: 1999

Manager
Individual
 Serbian Coach of the Year: 2019
 Gazzetta Sport Legend Award: 2019
 Serie A Coach of the Month: April 2022

Footnotes

References

External links

 
 
 

1969 births
2022 deaths
Sportspeople from Vukovar
Serbs of Croatia
Association football midfielders
Association football central defenders
Serbian footballers
FK Vojvodina players
Red Star Belgrade footballers
A.S. Roma players
U.C. Sampdoria players
S.S. Lazio players
Inter Milan players
Inter Milan non-playing staff
Bologna F.C. 1909 managers
Catania S.S.D. managers
ACF Fiorentina managers
U.C. Sampdoria managers
A.C. Milan managers
Torino F.C. managers
Sporting CP managers
Serie A players
Serie A managers
Serbia national football team managers
Serbian expatriate sportspeople in Italy
Naturalised citizens of Italy
Expatriate football managers in Italy
Expatriate footballers in Italy
1998 FIFA World Cup players
UEFA Euro 2000 players
Yugoslav footballers
Yugoslavia under-21 international footballers
Yugoslavia international footballers
Yugoslav First League players
Serbian football managers
Serbian expatriate football managers
Serbia and Montenegro international footballers
Serbia and Montenegro expatriate sportspeople in Italy
Serbia and Montenegro expatriate footballers
Serbia and Montenegro footballers
Serbian people of Croatian descent
Serbian people of Bosnia and Herzegovina descent
Deaths from acute myeloid leukemia 
Deaths from cancer in Lazio
Burials at Campo Verano